Utin may refer to:

 Utin (castle), a former Wendish castle in north Germany
 Saint-Utin, a commune in north-eastern France
 Ikouwem Udo Utin (born 1999), Nigerian football player

See also
 Utina (disambiguation)